Berta Zuckerkandl-Szeps (born Bertha Szeps; 13 April 1864 – 16 October 1945) was an Austrian writer, journalist, and art critic.

Bertha Szeps was the daughter of Galician Jewish liberal newspaper publisher Moritz Szeps and was raised in Vienna. She was married to the Hungarian anatomist Emil Zuckerkandl.

From end of the 19th century until 1938, she led an important literary salon in Vienna, originally from a villa in Döbling, later in the Oppolzergasse near the Burgtheater. Many famous Viennese artists and personalities including Auguste Rodin, Gustav Klimt, Gustav Mahler, Hugo von Hofmannsthal, Max Reinhardt, Arthur Schnitzler Stefan Zweig, Egon Friedell and others frequented the salon. Her sister Sophie (1862–1937) was married to Paul Clemenceau, the brother of the French President Georges Clemenceau, and, therefore, she also had good ties to Parisian artistic circles. She translated a number of plays from French to German and was a cofounder of the Salzburg Music Festival.

In 1938, she emigrated to Paris and later to Algiers. She returned in 1945 to Paris and died there the same year. She is buried at the Père Lachaise Cemetery.

Works 
My life and History. Alfred A. Knopf. New York, 1939. Translated by John Sommerfield
Die Pflege der Kunst in Österreich 1848–1898.
 Dekorative Kunst und Kunstgewerbe. Wien, 1900
 Zeitkunst Wien 1901–1907. Hugo Heller, Wien, 1908
 Ich erlebte 50 Jahre Weltgeschichte. Bermann-Fischer Verlag, Stockholm, 1939
 Clemenceau tel que je l'ai connu. Algier, 1944
 Österreich intim. Erinnerungen 1892–1942. Propyläen, Frankfurt/Main, 1970 (paperback edition: Ullstein, Frankfurt am Main, 1988)

Further reading 
 : In meinem Salon ist Österreich. Berta Zuckerkandl und ihre Zeit. 3. A. Herold, Wien 1985

See also 
 Salon of Berta Zuckerkandl

References

1864 births
1945 deaths
Austrian journalists
Austrian women journalists
Austrian salon-holders
Jews and Judaism in Vienna
Austrian Jews
Austrian women writers
Writers from Vienna
Burials at Père Lachaise Cemetery
Austrian critics
Austrian women critics